This is a list of fossiliferous stratigraphic units in Ethiopia.



List of fossiliferous stratigraphic units

See also 

 Lists of fossiliferous stratigraphic units in Africa
 List of fossiliferous stratigraphic units in Djibouti
 List of fossiliferous stratigraphic units in Eritrea
 List of fossiliferous stratigraphic units in Kenya
 List of fossiliferous stratigraphic units in Sudan
 Geology of Ethiopia

References

Further reading 
 G. Assefa, D. Clark, and M. Williams. 1982. Late Cenozoic history and archaeology of the Upper Webi Shebele Basin, east central Ethiopia. Ethiop. Journal of Science 5(1):27-46
 J. D. Clark, Y. Beyene, G. WoldeGabriel, W. K. Hart, P. R. Renne, H. Gilbert, A. Defleur, G. Suwa, S. Katoh, K. R. Ludwig, J.-R. Boisserie, B. Asfaw, and T. D. White. 2003. Stratigraphic, chronological and behavioural contexts of Pleistocene Homo sapiens from Middle Awash, Ethiopia. Nature 423:747-752
 J. D. Clark, B. Asfaw, G. Assefa, J.W.K. Harris, H. Kurashina, R.C. Walter, T.D. White and M.A.J. Williams. 1984. Paleoanthropological discoveries in the Middle Awash Valley, Ethiopia. Nature 307:423-428
 D. Clark and H. Kurashina. 1979. Hominid occupation of the east central Highlands of Ethiopia in the Plio-Pleistocene. Nature 282:33-39
 M. B. Goodwin, W. A. Clemens, J. H. Hutchison, C. B. Wood, M. S. Zavada, A. Kemp, C. J. Duffin and C. R. Schaff. 1999. Mesozoic continental vertebrates with associated palynostratigraphic dates from the northwestern Ethiopian plateau. Journal of Vertebrate Paleontology 19(4):728-741
 C. Guerin. 1985. Les Rhinoceros et les Chalicotheres (Mammalia, Perissodactyla) des gisements de la Vallee de l'Omo en Ethiopie (collections francaise) [The rhinoceroses and chalicotheres (Mammalia, Perissodactyla) from the Omo Valley localities in Ethiopia]. in Coppens, Y. ed., Les faunes Plio-Pleistocenes de la basse Vallee de l'Omo (Ethiopie)Artiodactyles (les Bovidae); expedition internationale 1967–1976, Paris. Editions du Centre National de la Recherche Scientifique, Sep. 1985, Cahiers de Paleontologie, Section Vertebres, Paris, France. 1985:67-96
 F. C. Howell, L. S. Fichter, and G. Eck. 1969. Vertebrate assemblages from the Usno Formation, White Sands and Brown Sands localities, lower Omo basin, Ethiopia. Quaternaria 11:65-88
 R. Jordan. 1971. Megafossilien des Jura aus dem Antalo-Kalk von Nord-Äthiopien [Jurassic megafossils from the Antalo Limestone of northern Ethiopia]. Beihefte zum Geologischen Jahrbuch 116:141-171
 J. E. Kalb, C. J. Jolly, A. Mebrate, S. Tebedge, C. Smart, E.B. Oswald, D. Cramer, P. Whitehead, C.B. Wood, G.C. Conroy, T. Adefris, L. Sperling, and B. Kana. 1982. Fossil Mammals and Artifacts from the Middle Awash Valley, Ethiopia. Nature 298:25-29
 W. Kiessling, D. K. Pandey, M. Schemm-Gregory, H. Mewis, and M. Aberhan. 2011. Marine benthic invertebrates from the Upper Jurassic of northern Ethiopia and their biogeographic affinities. Journal of African Earth Sciences 59:195-214
 M. G. Leakey and J. M. Harris. 2003. Lothagam: the dawn of humanity in eastern Africa. Lothagam: the dawn of humanity in eastern Africa 678
 M. G. Leakey and C. Feibel. 1996. Lothagam: a record of faunal change in the late Miocene of East Africa. Journal of Vertebrate Paleontology 16(3):556-570
 M. G. Leakey. 1982. Extinct large Colobines from the Plio-Pleistocene of Africa. American Journal of Physical Anthropology 58:153-172
 G. Suwa, R. T. Kono, S. Katoh, B. Asfaw, and Y. Beyene. 2007. A new species of great ape from the late Miocene epoch in Ethiopia. Nature 448:921-924
 H. B. Wesselman. 1984. The Omo Micromammals: Systematics and Paleoecology of Early Man Sites from Ethiopia. Contributions to Vertebrate Evolution 17

Ethiopia
Paleontology in Ethiopia
Geologic formations of Ethiopia
Ethiopia geography-related lists
Fossil